Stenoma adytodes is a moth of the family Depressariidae. It is found in Peru.

The wingspan is 26–28 mm. The forewings are dark fuscous with a broad white costal streak from near the base to beyond the middle, the ends pointed, the costal edge pale ochreous. There is an irregular-edged rounded white apical blotch extending on the costa to two-thirds and a slender pale brownish-ochreous dorsal streak throughout, expanded into a triangular postmedian blotch tipped white, the tornal extremity also white. The hindwings are whitish ochreous suffused light grey, with the apex whitish.

References

Moths described in 1925
Stenoma
Taxa named by Edward Meyrick